The Capitol View Corridors are a series of legal restrictions on construction in Austin, Texas, aimed at preserving protected views of the Texas State Capitol from various points around the city. First established by the Texas Legislature in 1983 and recodified in 2001, the corridors are meant to protect the capitol dome from obstruction by high-rise buildings. While supported by cultural and historical preservation organizations, the corridors have also been criticized for limiting the potential for the development of new tall structures in downtown Austin.

History
From that time until the early 1960s, only the University of Texas Main Building Tower was built higher than the limit, using an exception allowing for additional height with a greater setback. On November 10, 1962, the Austin Statesman announced that real-estate developers were planning a new high-rise residential building adjacent to the Capitol called the Westgate Tower.

The prospect of so tall a structure so close to the Capitol met with significant hostility as plans proceeded. In January 1963, Texas Governor Price Daniel voiced his opposition to the proposed tower in his final address to the Texas Legislature. Resistance continued as construction progressed, with State Representative Henry Grover of Houston introducing a bill to condemn the property in February 1965, which was defeated in March in the Texas House of Representatives by only two votes. The Westgate was completed in 1966, but the controversy over the preservation of the Capitol's visual presence that dogged its construction continued to grow.

The Westgate was followed by even taller structures: first the  Dobie Center (designed in 1968), and then a series of ever larger downtown bank towers, culminating in the  One American Center (designed in 1982). In January 1983, inspired by the Westgate and these other structures, State Senator Lloyd Doggett and State Representative Gerald Hill introduced Senate Bill 176, "Relating to preservation of the view of the State Capitol from certain points and prohibition of certain construction." This bill proposed a list of protected "Capitol View Corridors" along which construction would not be permitted, so as to create protected views from a series of points around Austin.

The bill passed through the Texas Senate and House of Representatives in early 1983, ultimately being signed into law on May 3, 1983, and coming into effect immediately. It was later recodified in 2001 by House Bill 2812, which established the current version of the statute in the Texas Government Code Chapter 3151, entitled "Preservation of View of State Capitol". This code defines the thirty state-protected viewing corridors and prohibits any construction that would intersect one of them. In 1985 the City of Austin adopted a corresponding Capitol View Protection Ordinance, so that the majority of the corridors are protected under the Austin Code of Ordinances Chapter 25-2 Appendix A, entitled "Boundaries of the Capitol View Corridors", as well as under state law.

Amendments and additions

The state legislation defining the corridors was amended in 2001 and 2003 to accommodate a series of public development projects, including the redevelopment of the defunct Mueller Airport and an expansion of Darrell K Royal–Texas Memorial Stadium, and again in 2013 to clarify the relationship between the state and city codes.

In 2007, the Austin City Council asked the Downtown Commission to review the existing corridors and propose updates or modifications. The commission's final report, delivered on June 27, 2007, recommended that eleven of the thirty corridors be reconsidered or modified. Six of the recommended changes were to correct technical errors in the statute or to bring the city and state laws into agreement, and two were to update the laws to reflect portions of the corridors that were already obstructed. The other four recommendations were more controversial, attracting opposition from the city's Parks and Recreation Board, the Heritage Society of Austin, and others; no changes were ultimately made.

In February 2017, the Austin City Council considered a proposal from Council Member Ora Houston to designate additional protected viewing corridors in east Austin. The proposal was provisionally approved by council on February 16, after an amendment removed one of the five proposed new corridors; that corridor was later restored to the proposal on March 2. , city staff are reviewing the proposed additional corridors for feasibility.

Impact on development

Since their creation, the Capital View Corridors have been a frequent focus of conflict among various groups in Austin and in the Texas government. On one hand, cultural conservation and historical preservation organizations have generally supported the restrictions, arguing that the capitol views form an important part of Austin's cultural heritage and are threatened by the city's growth and land development. On the other hand, both private and public entities looking to build in Austin (especially downtown) have expressed concern about the corridors' impact on investment, on property tax receipts, and on the supply of jobs and housing.

A number of high-rise buildings in central Austin have been designed with diagonal floor plans to avoid obstructing a viewing corridor, such as the Fifth & West Residences Tower; other towers suddenly become narrower when they reach the height of a viewing plane, like the 360 Condominiums Tower. Some major civic development projects have received exemptions from the corridor protections, including the redevelopment of the former Mueller Airport and the expansion of the University of Texas football stadium; in other cases, structures already completed have been condemned and rebuilt because of the corridors, including a newly built water intake facility for the Waller Creek Tunnel. Low-lying corridors prevent essentially all construction on certain blocks downtown.

Corridors

A Capitol View Corridor is a quadrilateral that links a line segment somewhere in Greater Austin to the base of the capitol dome. No structure is permitted to be built in a manner that would intersect the viewing corridor and thus obstruct the protected view of the Capitol. , state law defines thirty Capitol View Corridors in Austin, while municipal code defines twenty-six protected corridors, twenty-one of which are identical to state-defined corridors and five of which differ slightly from five of the state corridors. Many of the corridors protect stationary or pedestrian views, and others protect vehicular views from roadways (some corridors protect both).

References

External links

 Map of the existing and proposed Capitol View Corridors on Google Maps

1983 establishments in Texas
1983 legislation
Austin, Texas
Cultural heritage conservation
Texas statutes
Urban planning in the United States